WVIK (90.3 FM) is the flagship National Public Radio station for the Quad Cities region of eastern Iowa and northwest Illinois. It is based in Rock Island, Illinois, and licensed to and owned by Augustana College. The studios are located on Augustana's campus in Rock Island. The station also operates two low-powered translators – K240DZ at 95.9 FM in Dubuque, Iowa and K289BI at 105.7 in Davenport, Iowa.

The station signed on for the first time on August 25, 1980, on 90.1 FM. The Quad Cities had been one of the last areas of Iowa and Illinois without a city-grade signal from an NPR station. Prior to 1980, the only source of NPR programming in the area had been a low-powered translator of Cedar Falls' KUNI, though much of the area got grade B coverage from Iowa City's WSUI. In 1991, it moved to its current frequency, and activated its Dubuque translator in 1996.

In March 2022, WVIK announced plans to realign its programming streams. The full-power 90.3 FM signal will air NPR news and talk programming full time, while the 105.7 FM translator in Davenport will carry classical programming 24/7. As part of the realignment, the 105.7 FM frequency will be upgraded to cover more of the Quad Cities.

References

External links

 WVIK, Quad Cities NPR

Augustana College (Illinois)
VIK
WVIK
Radio stations established in 1980
Radio stations in the Quad Cities